The Second Van Agt cabinet was the executive branch of the Dutch Government from 11 September 1981 until 29 May 1982. The cabinet was formed by the christian-democratic Christian Democratic Appeal (CDA), the social-democratic Labour Party (PvdA) and the social-liberal Democrats 66 (D'66) after the election of 1981. The cabinet was a centrist grand coalition and had a substantial majority in the House of Representatives with Christian-Democratic Leader Dries van Agt serving as Prime Minister. Former Labour Prime Minister Joop den Uyl the Labour Leader served as Deputy Prime Minister, Minister of Social Affairs and Employment and was given the portfolio of Netherlands Antilles Affars, Progressive-Liberal Leader Jan Terlouw served as Deputy Prime Minister and Minister of Economic Affairs.

The cabinet served in the early years of the turbulent 1980s. Domestically it had to deal with the 1980s recession and a growing inflation but it was able to implement a major social reform to social security. The cabinet suffered several major internal conflicts between the cabinet members of the Christian Democratic Appeal and the Labour Party, especially the poor working relationship between Prime Minister Van Agt and Deputy Prime Minister Den Uyl which lead to the fall of the cabinet just 243 days into its term on 12 May 1982 with the Labour Party cabinet members resigning on 29 May 1982 and the cabinet was replaced with the caretaker  Third Van Agt cabinet.

Formation
After the 1981 general election the Christian Democratic Appeal (CDA) of incumbent Prime Minister Dries van Agt was the winner of the election but lost 1 seat and had now a total of 48 seats. The Labour Party (PvdA) of Joop den Uyl lost 9 seats and had now 44 seats. The Democrats 66 (D'66) of Jan Terlouw was the biggest winner with 9 new seats and had now 17 seats. A long negotiation between the Christian Democratic Appeal, Labour Party and the Democrats 66 followed. The negotiations were troubled by the personal animosity between incumbent Prime Minister and Leader of the Christian Democratic Appeal Dries van Agt and former Prime Minister and Leader of the Labour Party Joop den Uyl. Van Agt who served as Deputy Prime Minister under Den Uyl his cabinet had a bad working relationship. In the end a coalition was formed.

Term
Many incidents made a healthy coalition impossible. Prime Minister Dries van Agt (CDA) had much trouble with Deputy Prime Minister Joop den Uyl (PvdA). Den Uyl tried to create employment as Minister of Social Affairs but plans to reform the health insurance was met with a huge resistance from the left-wing. The cabinet fell because the Christian Democrats wanted a cut in government spending, while the Labour Party opposed it.

Cabinet Members

Trivia
 Five cabinet members had previous experience as scholars and professors: Dries van Agt (Criminal Law and Procedure), Jan Terlouw (Nuclear Physics), Job de Ruiter (Civil Law), Jos van Kemenade (Education Sociology) and Michiel Scheltema (Constitutional and Administrative Law).
 Four cabinet members (later) served as Party Leaders and Lijsttrekkers: Dries van Agt (1976–1982) of the Christian Democratic Appeal, Joop den Uyl (1966–1986) of the Labour Party, Jan Terlouw (1973–1982) and Hans van Mierlo (1966–1973, 1986–1998) of the Democrats 66.
 Four cabinet members would later be granted the honorary title of Minister of State: Max van der Stoel (1991), Hans van Mierlo (1998), Jos van Kemenade (2002) and Hans van den Broek (2005).
 Twelve cabinet members (later) served as Mayor: Ed van Thijn (Amsterdam), Jos van Kemenade (Eindhoven), Henk Zeevalking (Utrecht and Rijswijk), André van der Louw (Rotterdam), Hans Kombrink (Zaanstad), Piet van Zeil (Heerlen), Jan van Houwelingen (Haarlemmermeer), Ien Dales (Nijmegen), Wim Deetman (The Hague), Jaap van der Doef (Vlissingen and Almere), Siepie de Jong (Leek) and Hans de Boer (Haarlemmermeer).

References

External links
Official

  Kabinet-Van Agt II Parlement & Politiek
  Kabinet-Van Agt II Rijksoverheid

Cabinets of the Netherlands
1981 establishments in the Netherlands
1982 disestablishments in the Netherlands
Cabinets established in 1981
Cabinets disestablished in 1982
Grand coalition governments